Phellodon atratus is a species of tooth fungus in the family Bankeraceae. Found in North America, it was described as new to science in 1964 by Canadian mycologist Kenneth A. Harrison. It occurs most frequently closer to the Pacific coast and under Sitka spruce.

The cap is dark violet to black, sometimes making it difficult to see. The margins are usually lighter. The flesh is violet or blue-black.

Phellodon melaleucus is similar, but appears more brownish, also staining brown.

References

External links

Fungi described in 1964
Fungi of North America
Inedible fungi
atratus